The 3rd Illinois General Assembly, consisting of the Illinois Senate and the Illinois House of Representatives, met from December 2, 1822, to February 18, 1823, during the first two years of Edward Coles' governorship,  at The Vandalia State House.  The apportionment of seats in the House of Representatives was based on the provisions of the First Illinois Constitution. Political parties were not established in the State at the time.

The 3rd General Assembly was preceded by the 2nd Illinois General Assembly, and was succeeded by the 4th Illinois General Assembly.

Members
This list is arranged by chamber, then by county. Senators and Representatives were both allotted to counties roughly by population and elected at-large within their districts. Greene and White counties shared one senator.

Senate

Bond County
 Martin Jones

Crawford County
 Daniel Parker

Edwards County
 Robert Frazier

Gallatin County
 Michael Jones

Greene County
George Cadwell

Hamilton County'
Thomas Sloo

Jackson County
 William Boon

Johnson County
Milton Ladd

Madison County
 Theophilus W. Smith

Monroe County
 Joseph A. Beaird

Pope County
 Lewis Barker

Randolph County
Samuel Crozier

'Sangamon County
Stephen Stillman

St. Clair County
 William Kinney

Union County
 John Grammar

Washington County
 Andrew Bankson

'Wayne County
William Kinkade

White County
 Leonard White

House of Representatives

'Alexander County
 William M. Alexander

Bond County
 Jonathan C. Pugh

Clark County
 William Lowery

Crawford County
 R.C. Ford
 David McGahey

Edwards County
 G.T. Pell

Fayette County, Illinois
 William Barry

Franklin County
 Thomas Dorris

Gallatin County
 J.G. Daimwood
 M. Davenport

Greene County
 Thomas Rattan

Jackson County
 Conrad Will

Jefferson County
 Zadok Casey

Johnson County
 William McFatridge

Lawrence County
 Abram Cairns

Madison County
 Curtis Brakeman
 George Churchill
 E.J. West

Monroe County
 William Alexander

''Pike County
Nicholas Hansen (ousted)
John Shaw (replaced Hansen)

Pope County
Samuel Alexander
James A. Whiteside

Randolph County
Thomas Mather
John McFerron
Raphael Widen

'Sangamon County
James Sims

St. Clair County
Joseph Trotier
Risden Moore
Jacob Ogle

Union County
Alexander Pope Field
John McIntosh

Washington County
James Turner (resigned February 18, 1823)

Wayne County
Alexander Campbell

White County
John Emmett
George R. Logan
Alexander Phillips

Employees

Senate 
 Secretary: Thomas Lippincott
 Enrolling and Engrossing Clerk: H.S. Dodge
 Doorkeeper: John O. Prentice

House of Representatives 
 Clerk: Charles Dunn
 Enrolling and Engrossing Clerk:  H.S. Dodge, Winsted Davie
 Doorkeeper: John Lee

See also
 List of Illinois state legislatures

Works cited

References

Illinois legislative sessions
Illinois
Illinois
1822 in Illinois
1823 in Illinois